Diphyllidea is a monotypic order of Cestoda (tapeworms). Members of this order are gut parasites of elasmobranch fishes including rays and sharks.

References

Cestoda
Platyhelminthes orders